This is a list of chocolate bar brands, in alphabetical order. Flavour variants and discontinued chocolate bars are included. A chocolate bar, also known as a candy bar in American English, is a confection in an oblong or rectangular form containing chocolate, which may also contain layerings or mixtures that include nuts, fruit, caramel, nougat, and wafers.

Key:

0-9

A

B

C

D

E

F

G

H

I

J

K

L

M

N

O

P

R

S

T

U

V

W

Y

Z

See also

 List of bean-to-bar chocolate manufacturers
 List of confectionery brands
 Candy bar, which includes a list of candy bars that do not contain chocolate

References

Chocolate Bar Brands
Chocolate

Chocolate